Lars-Marius Waldal (born 21 September 1973) is a Norwegian luger, born in Oslo. He competed at the 1994 Winter Olympics in Lillehammer.

References

External links

1973 births
Living people
Sportspeople from Oslo
Norwegian male lugers
Olympic lugers of Norway
Lugers at the 1994 Winter Olympics